The Moody Blues were an English progressive rock band from Birmingham. Formed in May 1964, the group originally consisted of guitarist and vocalist Denny Laine, keyboardist and vocalist Mike Pinder, woodwind player and vocalist Ray Thomas, bassist Clint Warwick, and drummer Graeme Edge. The band remained active until late 2018, when sole constant member Edge retired from performing, at which point the lineup also included 1966 additions Justin Hayward on guitar and vocals, and John Lodge on bass and vocals. For their final few tours, the core trio were augmented by touring members Norda Mullen on flute, guitar and percussion (from 2003), Julie Ragins on keyboards, guitar, saxophone and percussion (from 2006), Alan Hewitt on keyboards (from 2010), and Billy Ashbaugh on drums and percussion (from 2016).

History
The Moody Blues were formed in May 1964 by Denny Laine, Mike Pinder, Ray Thomas, Clint Warwick and Graeme Edge. The band debuted in September that year with the single "Steal Your Heart Away", which was followed a year later by their first album The Magnificent Moodies. After a few more singles, the group faced its first change in personnel when Warwick left at the end of June 1966, claiming that his role was "keeping him apart from his wife and two small children too much". He was temporarily replaced by Rod Clark. On 1 October 1966, Laine also left the Moody Blues to pursue a solo career. A month later, the group returned with new members Justin Hayward (formerly of Marty Wilde's band) in place of Laine, and John Lodge (an early bandmate of Ray Thomas) taking over from Clark.

The lineup of Hayward, Lodge, Pinder, Thomas and Edge remained stable for twelve years, releasing a string of successful albums including UK number-ones On the Threshold of a Dream (1969), A Question of Balance (1970) and Every Good Boy Deserves Favour (1971). When Pinder refused to tour in promotion of the 1978 release Octave, he was replaced that October by former Yes keyboardist Patrick Moraz. Pinder did not return after the tour, and later took legal action against the remaining members in an attempt to prevent them from releasing 1981's Long Distance Voyager under the Moody Blues name (which was unsuccessful).

Starting in 1986, the Moody Blues began touring with an extended lineup, which initially included second keyboardist Bias Boshell, and backing vocalists Janis Liebhart and Wendy McKenzie. Guy Allison took over from Boshell in 1987, and in 1988 the backing vocalists were replaced by Shaun Murphy and Naomi Starr. By 1990, Boshell had returned on keyboards, and Bekka Bramlett and Terry Wood had taken over backing vocal duties. After the recording of the band's 14th studio albums Keys of the Kingdom in the spring of 1991, Moraz was fired from the band and credited on the release as one of the "additional performers".

Moraz was not replaced in the band's official lineup. Starting with the 1991 tour, Boshell took over as lead keyboardist, Paul Bliss was brought in as backup, and Susan Shattock and June Boyce took over on backing vocals. In 1993, Tracy Graham replaced Boyce. The group's touring lineup remained constant until April 2001, which marked the final appearances of Boshell and Graham. The pair were replaced by keyboardist and backing vocalist Bernie Barlow. In December 2002, Ray Thomas announced that he would be retiring from performing, reducing the band's official lineup to the trio of Hayward, Lodge and Edge.

Thomas was replaced in the Moody Blues touring lineup by flautist and guitarist Norda Mullen. In 2003, the band released Christmas album December. Julie Ragins replaced Barlow in 2006, after initially substituting for the keyboardist late the previous year. Barlow took over for a year in 2009, before Ragins returned from 2010. Also in 2010, Alan Hewitt joined the touring band as their second keyboardist. Billy Ashbaugh replaced Marshall as second live drummer starting in 2016, with Edge primarily playing piano during live shows. Ray Thomas died on 4 January 2018. The group continued touring until Edge retired from performing at the end of 2018, although the possibility of a return was mentioned in interviews by Lodge. On 11 November 2021, however, Edge died, marking the end of the Moody Blues.

Members

Official

Touring

Timelines
Official members

Touring members

Lineups

References

External links
The Moody Blues official website

Moody Blues, The